Bradley International Airport (IATA:BDL) is an airport in the United States.

BDL may also refer to:

 Banque du Liban, a Lebanese central bank
 Bharat Dynamics Limited, an Indian defense company
 Brewers' Distributor, a Canadian beer distributor